Pro Controller may refer to:
 Classic Controller Pro
 Wii U Pro Controller
 Nintendo Switch Pro Controller